Jung In-seo (born May 9, 2000) is a South Korean actress. She is best known for her main roles in Store Struck by Lightning, Drama Special Season 2: Duet, and the film Silenced.

Filmography

Television

Film

References

External links 

Profile (daum)
Official Agency site

2000 births
Living people
21st-century South Korean actresses
South Korean female models
South Korean television actresses
South Korean film actresses